Talcy is a commune of the Loir-et-Cher department, central France.

It is known for the Château de Talcy.

Population

See also
Communes of the Loir-et-Cher department

References

Communes of Loir-et-Cher